Michael Hodges (born September 29, 1986) is an American football coach who is the linebackers coach for the New Orleans Saints of the National Football League (NFL).

Playing career 
Hodges initially played college football at the United States Air Force Academy, before transferring to Blinn College in Brenham, Texas before opting to walk-on at Texas A&M. As a senior, he was awarded the Aggie Heart Award, the highest honor given to a senior.

Coaching career 
After his playing career ended, Hodges worked as a strength & conditioning assistant at Texas A&M while he worked on his master's degree. He then went on to coach at Fresno State as a graduate assistant working with the inside linebackers from 2012 to 2013. Hodges was hired to coach linebackers at Eastern Illinois in 2014, and was eventually promoted to co-defensive coordinator in 2016.

New Orleans Saints 
Hodges was hired by the New Orleans Saints in 2017 to work as a defensive assistant. He was promoted to assistant linebackers coach in 2019.

He was promoted to linebackers coach in 2020 following the departure of Mike Nolan.

Personal life 
A native of Helotes, Texas, Hodges graduated from Texas A&M University with both a BS in Sports Management and a master's degree in marketing. He and his wife Ashley have two children.

References

External links 
 Michael Hodges on Twitter
 New Orleans Saints bio
 Texas A&M Aggies bio

1986 births
Living people
Sportspeople from San Antonio
Players of American football from San Antonio
American football linebackers
Air Force Falcons football players
Blinn Buccaneers football players
Texas A&M Aggies football players
Texas A&M University alumni
Texas A&M Aggies football coaches
Fresno State Bulldogs football coaches
Eastern Illinois Panthers football coaches
New Orleans Saints coaches